The Hong Kong Public Libraries (HKPL) is a system of 70 static and 12 mobile public libraries in Hong Kong. Offering a total collection of 14.35 million items, the system is managed by the Leisure and Cultural Services Department. The network of libraries are interconnected by a computerised library management system, one of the largest bilingual systems in the world, offering both Chinese and English capabilities.

The library head office is located on the eleventh floor of the Hong Kong Central Library in Causeway Bay.

History 
The first public library of Hong Kong, the City Hall Library, was established in 1869 in the former Hong Kong City Hall. The library ceased to operate after the demolition of the old city hall in 1933.

The first modern library opened in 1962 at the new City Hall, which was also the central library for many years before the opening of the Central Library. Over ten thousand library cards were issued in the first month of service, and borrowers were limited to only one book at a time.  The second location and the first in Kowloon was the Waterloo Road Library, opened 1965 (later replaced by the Kowloon Public Library in 1984). The Pok Fu Lam Public Library opened next in December 1970 in the newly constructed Wah Fu Estate, and has served that community continuously for over 40 years. The first public library in the New Territories opened in Fuk Loi Estate, Tsuen Wan New Town, in 1974. In 1976 the first mobile library was introduced. The Tsuen Wan Central Library, at the time of its opening in July 1993, was the largest library in Hong Kong.

The public libraries were originally administered by either the Urban Council or Regional Council, depending on the location. When the municipal councils were abolished in 1999, the library systems were merged under the newly formed Leisure and Cultural Services Department.

The Hong Kong Central Library was completed in 2001 and is the largest public library in the territory. This twelve-story building is equipped with state-of-the-art technologies and serves as the administrative headquarters and main library of the public library network. It is also the major information centre for Hong Kong.

Security Issue 

All libraries in Hong Kong are subject to "Library Regulations" Regulators, the only part of the regulation is out of date. Such as listening area and viewing area, no person shall ─ more than one record or listen to a song, or repeat playing of any record or song; or watch more than one movie or watch a movie more than once.

In addition, the library also prohibits photo taking and video recording, especially after the popularity of smartphones in 2012.  Many "No photo-taking" signs are set up in several locations, including the entrance, children's library, staircase, and study rooms. Meanwhile, the library also has security to maintain the order of the library, including the enforcement of the "No photo-taking" rule. The library does not allow general citizens to apply for photography, only commercial filming is allowed and standard fees apply.

Controversies

Book censorship 
In July 2020, after the passage of the Hong Kong national security law, under the direction of the authorities, the library has removed pro-democracy books; the books have been marked "under review". At least nine books had been removed, including books by Joshua Wong, Tanya Chan and Horace Chin. US Secretary of State Mike Pompeo thinks it is the "latest assault on the rights and freedoms of the people of Hong Kong".

See also 

List of libraries in Hong Kong

Notes

Bibliography

External links

Official website
Libraries in Hong Kong (in Chinese)

 
ISBN agencies